L'Évasion des Dalton is a Lucky Luke comic written by Goscinny and Morris. It is the fifteenth album in the series. The comic was printed by Dupuis in 1960 and Cinebook in English in 2011 as The Daltons' Escape.

Synopsis 
The Daltons manage to escape the penitentiary. Lucky Luke is set on their trail. The four brothers, eager to avenge Lucky Luke, place fake search notices and publish fake newspaper articles to make Luke a criminal.

Fortunately for Lucky Luke, people are, for the most part, far too afraid to dare to attack him. Finally, Luke finds the Daltons and is captured. They force the cowboy to serve as a stooge by doing a lot of chores.

Finally, Lucky Luke manages to escape with the help of the cavalry and assault the Daltons. Joe and Luke duel, with Joe putting oil in his holster hoping to draw faster. But his own trick turns against him and Lucky Luke succeeds in bringing back the four brothers to the penitentiary... while waiting for the next escape.

Characters 

 The Dalton brothers: Four evil, stupid bandit brothers.

References

 Morris publications in Spirou BDoubliées

External links
 Lucky Luke official site album index 
Goscinny website on Lucky Luke

Comics by Morris (cartoonist)
Lucky Luke albums
1960 graphic novels
Works by René Goscinny